The Adamów brown coal mine was a large open-pit mine in Turek, Greater Poland Voivodeship, central Poland, 208 km west of the capital, Warsaw. At the time of its commissioning Adamów held one of the largest lignite reserves in Poland, estimated to be 90 million tonnes of coal. The annual coal production was around 1.6 million tonnes.

In August 2020 the management announced that the mine will be closed by the end of the year. Because there was still some coal left, the management decided to continue operations and the last excavator was permanently turned off at 4:50 pm on 17 February 2021. There are plans to install a photovoltaic array on the site.

References

External links
 Official site

Coal mines in Greater Poland Voivodeship
Coal mines in Poland